Liolaemus thermarum is a species of lizard in the family Iguanidae.  It is found in Argentina.

References

thermarum
Lizards of South America
Reptiles of Argentina
Endemic fauna of Argentina
Reptiles described in 1996
Taxa named by José Miguel Alfredo María Cei